Spanish Lake can refer to:

 A lake
 Spanish Lake in Fresno County, California
 Spanish Lake (Ascension Parish), a lake in the US state of Louisiana
 Spanish Lake (Iberia Parish), a lake in the US state of Louisiana

 A peak
 Spanish Lake Centre, a peak of the Flourmill Volcanoes in British Columbia, Canada

 A Populated Place
 Spanish Lake, Missouri, a suburb of Saint Louis in the United States
 Spanish Lake community, a village in Natchitoches Parish, Louisiana

Other uses
Spanish Lake (film), a film about the city in Missouri
The Spanish Lake is a nickname given to the Pacific Ocean in certain sources between 1521 and 1898.

See also
List of lakes#Spain